Brian James Anderson (born April 26, 1972) is an American former Major League Baseball pitcher, who played 13 seasons for five teams, as well as a sports broadcaster and coach. Currently, Anderson is the color commentator on the Rays TV crew on Bally Sports Sun.

Early life and education
Anderson was born on April 26, 1972, in Portsmouth, Virginia. At Geneva High School (Ohio), Anderson was a four-year letterman in baseball, a three-year letterman in golf, and a two-year letterman in basketball.  He went on to attend Wright State University in Dayton, Ohio. In 1991 and 1992, he played collegiate summer baseball with the Wareham Gatemen of the Cape Cod Baseball League.

Anderson was selected by the California Angels in the 1st round (3rd pick overall) of the 1993 Major League Baseball draft.

Professional career
Anderson began his major league career with the California Angels in 1993. Between 1993 and 1995, he was 13–13 with a 5.46 ERA.

He was traded prior to the 1996 season to the Cleveland Indians for pitchers Jason Grimsley and Pep Harris. Anderson went 7–3 in two seasons with the Indians. He was on the 1997 playoff roster, in which he made six relief appearances, going 1–0 with 1 save.

Roughly a month after a solid performance during the 1997 World Series, Anderson was the second pick by the Arizona Diamondbacks in the 1997 MLB Expansion Draft.

In his first full season in the Majors, this time as a starter, Anderson went 12–13 with a 4.33 ERA in 32 starts and also pitched 2 complete games. The following season, he switched between the bullpen and the rotation, totaling 31 appearances to go along with 19 starts. In 2000, Anderson was back in the rotation full-time, finishing 11–7 with a career high in innings pitched (213.1) and in strikeouts (104).

In 2001, Anderson went 4–9 with a 5.20 ERA, in the postseason, he went 1–1 in 4 games.

Anderson was a swingman in 2002 for the Diamondbacks, pitching 35 games while starting 24 of them. His record was 6–11.

In 2003, Anderson signed with his former club, the Cleveland Indians. In his 24 starts with the Tribe, Anderson permitted 27 unearned runs due to errors the Indians committed.

Anderson was acquired by the Kansas City Royals during the 2003 season for three minor leaguers.

Between Cleveland and Kansas City, Anderson won a career high 14 games while also having a career low 3.78 ERA in 31 starts.

Anderson regressed in 2004, pitching poorly throughout the season. His record was 6–12 with a career high 5.64 ERA in 166 innings.

Anderson's  season ended prematurely when he tore an elbow ligament, necessitating Tommy John surgery. He re-injured it during his rehab program and had to undergo a second Tommy John surgery. During his convalescence in 2007, Anderson was a fill-in broadcaster for the Cleveland Indians.

On February 1, 2008, the Tampa Bay Rays signed Anderson to a minor league contract with an invitation to spring training. During spring training however, Anderson left the mound in the middle of a game, and followed that with an MRI. The MRI revealed he had a torn ulnar collateral ligament (for the third time), as well as a torn flexor mass muscle, both in his left elbow. Rays manager Joe Maddon commented by saying, "It can't be repaired; he's done. It's really a big disappointment."

Post-playing career
Following the second Tommy John surgery, Anderson was out of baseball for the 2007 season, during which he occasionally filled in as a broadcaster for the Cleveland Indians on SportsTime Ohio, as well as doing several spring training games and a weekly highlight show.

In 2008, he served temporarily as a color analyst for Rays television broadcasts during a ten-game West Coast road trip, teamed with play-by-play announcer Dewayne Staats while regular Rays broadcast partner Joe Magrane was away on assignment as an analyst for NBC Sports coverage of baseball at the 2008 Summer Olympics. During the 2008 and 2009 seasons, Anderson was an assistant to the pitching coach and worked in the front office for the Rays.

In 2009 and 2010, Anderson again worked as a part-time TV analyst for the Rays, calling about 50 games for which Magrane's successor, Kevin Kennedy, was unavailable. In October 2010, the Rays announced that Anderson would become the team's full-time TV analyst beginning in 2011.

Personal life
Anderson and his wife Jessica Marie married on November 1, 2014. They reside in St. Petersburg, Florida with their daughter, Harper Marie, born November 2015, and son Baker James, born November 27, 2018. Anderson also has two children from a previous marriage, Rylyn Mae (14) and Jackson James (12).

References

External links

Brian Anderson at Pura Pelota (Venezuelan Professional Baseball League)

1972 births
Living people
American sports announcers
Arizona Diamondbacks players
Baseball players from Virginia
Buffalo Bisons (minor league) players
California Angels players
Cleveland Indians announcers
Cleveland Indians players
Kansas City Royals players
Lake Elsinore Storm players
Major League Baseball broadcasters
Major League Baseball pitchers
Midland Angels players
Omaha Royals players
People from Geneva, Ohio
Sportspeople from Portsmouth, Virginia
Tampa Bay Rays announcers
Tiburones de La Guaira players
American expatriate baseball players in Venezuela
Tucson Sidewinders players
Vancouver Canadians players
American expatriate baseball players in Canada
Wright State Raiders baseball players
Wichita Wranglers players
People from St. Petersburg, Florida
All-American college baseball players
Wareham Gatemen players